The Indian Air Force currently operates seven Air Commands. Each command is headed by an Air Officer Commanding-in-Chief of the rank of Air Marshal.

The Air Force currently has over 60 air stations all over India. These are grouped into seven commands: Western Air Command at New Delhi, Delhi. Eastern Air Command at Shillong, Meghalaya. Central Air Command at Prayagraj, Uttar paradesh. Southern Air Command at Thiruvananthapuram, Kerala. South Western Air Command at Gandhinagar, Gujarat. Training Command at Bengaluru, Karnataka, and Maintenance Command at Nagpur, Maharashtra. The largest airbase is in Hindon, Uttar Pradesh.

There are a number of newer air stations being built as well, in line with India's strategic doctrine. The Indian Navy has some separate air stations for its aviation wing.

Western Air Command is the largest Air Command. It operates sixteen air stations from Jammu & Kashmir, Punjab, Haryana, Himachal Pradesh and a couple of Air stations in Uttar Pradesh. Eastern Air Command operates fifteen air stations in eastern and north-eastern India. Central Air Command operates two air stations in Uttar Pradesh, Madhya Pradesh and surrounding states of central India. Southern Air Command's tasks include protecting the vital shipping routes. It operates nine air stations in Southern India and two in the Andaman and Nicobar Islands. South Western Air Command is the front line of defence against Pakistan. This important command operates twelve air stations in Gujarat, Maharashtra and Rajasthan.

List of air stations

Note: Station and unit details are from Scramble.nl (2009) and outdated. Article needs to be revised/updated.

The other Air Force stations that come under Maintenance Command are not air stations and are mostly signal units and station repair depots situated in different towns. Delhi, for example, has a few BRDs and SUs that come under Maintenance Command.

List of advance landing grounds

Along China border

Chinese Military has an integrated Western Theater Command across the whole LAC with India. Indian Military has divided the LAC into 3 sectors - the western sector across Ladakh and the Chinese-held Aksai Chin, the central sector across Himachal Pradesh and Uttarakhand states, and the eastern sector across Sikkim and Arunachal Pradesh states. Similarly, Indian Airforce has Delhi-based Western Air Command, Prayagraj-based Central Air Command, and Shillong-based Eastern Air Command to cover the LAC.

 Ladakh
Daulat Beg Oldi ALG serves Trans-Karakoram Tract (Shaksgam), Aksai Chin and Siachen Glacier.

 Fukche ALG serves the Demchok sector.

 Nyoma ALG serves two separate noncontiguous but closely located disputed areas of Chumar North and Chumar South.

 Padum ALG Serves Ladakh LAC and Kargil LOC as a second line of defence airport.

 Thoise ALG
Parma Valley ALG near Chushul (proposed)

 Himachal Pradesh shares 250 km border with Tibet (China).
Shimla Airport, civil airport available for military use. Serves Kaurik, Tashigang-Shipki La and Nelang-Pulam Sumda disputed area.

 Kullu-Manali Airport, civil airport available for military use. Serves Kaurik, Tashigang-Shipki La, and Nelang-Pulam Sumda disputed area. 

 Kibber-Rangrik, surveyed as of July 2020, construction was approved in the January 2023 to be completed by 2024-25. Will be closest ALG to Chumar, Kaurik, and Tashigang-Shipki La disputed area.

 Uttarakhand has 350 km border with Tibet.

Chinyalisaur Airport ALG serves disputed Barahoti and Nelang-Pulam Sumda sector. ITBP has 42 BoPs (border outposts) in Barahoti sector and Mana Pass area (Nelang-Pulam Sumda sector).

 Pithoragarh Airport ALG serves disputed Kalapani territory.

 Sikkim

 Pakyong Airport AGL serves Doklam disputed area.

 Arunachal Pradesh

Aalo ALG, formerly Along,

Mechuka Advanced Landing Ground ALG
Pasighat ALG

Tawang Air Force Station 

Tuting ALG

Vijoynagar ALG

Walong Advanced Landing Ground (Walong ALG) 

Ziro ALG

Daporijo ALG, Arunachal Pradesh
Alinye (ALG), Dibang Valley District, Arunachal Pradesh

Along Pakistan border

 Ladakh
 Thoise ALG

Highway landing grounds 

 Uttar Pradesh
Bangarmau Airstrip, on Agra Lucknow Expressway

See also
 Similar capabilities lists
 India-China Border Roads
 Indian military satellites
 List of Indian Navy bases
 List of active Indian Navy ships
 India's overseas military bases
 Indian Nuclear Command Authority
 
 Adversary topics
 Western Theater Command, China
 East, Central and Western Command LAC, of India
 List of People's Liberation Army Air Force airbases
 Sino-Indian border dispute

 Other related topics
 Armed Forces Special Operations Division
 Defence Cyber Agency
 Integrated Defence Staff
 Indian Armed Forces
 Strategic Forces Command
 Special Forces of India

References

External links
 List of Indian Air Force stations at GlobalSecurity.org

India